Gang of Four are an English post-punk band, formed in 1976 in Leeds. The original members were singer Jon King, guitarist Andy Gill, bass guitarist Dave Allen and drummer Hugo Burnham. There have been many different line-ups including, among other notable musicians, Sara Lee, Gail Ann Dorsey, and Mark Heaney. After a brief lull in the 1980s, different constellations of the band recorded two studio albums in the 1990s. Between 2004 and 2006 the original line-up was reunited; Gill toured using the name between 2012 and his death in 2020. In 2021, the band announced that King, Burnham, and Lee would be reuniting for a tour in 2022 with David Pajo on guitar.

The band played a stripped-down mix of punk rock, funk and dub, with a lyrical emphasis on the social and political ills of society. Gang of Four are widely considered one of the leading bands of the late 1970s/early 1980s post-punk movement. Their debut album, Entertainment!, was ranked by Rolling Stone as the fifth greatest punk album of all time and at number 483 in their list of the 500 Greatest Albums of All Time. In 2004, the album was listed by Pitchfork Media as the 8th best album of the 1970s and, in 2020, by Pop Matters as "Best Post Punk album ever". Their early 80s albums (Songs of the Free and Hard) found them softening some of their more jarring qualities, and drifting towards dance-punk and disco. David Fricke of Rolling Stone described Gang of Four as  "probably the best politically motivated band in rock & roll.".

History

Early years and Entertainment! (1976–1979) 
The band initially consisted of vocalist Jon King, guitarist Andy Gill, drummer Hugo Burnham and bass guitarist Dave Wolfson. After two or three gigs, Wolfson was replaced with Dave Allen.

Gang of Four's music brought together an eclectic array of influences, ranging from the Frankfurt School of social criticism to the increasingly clear trans-Atlantic punk consensus. Gang of Four was named by Andy Corrigan, a member of the Mekons, while driving around with Gill and King when he came upon a newspaper billboard on the intra-Party coup against China's "Gang of Four".

The band's debut single, "Damaged Goods" backed with "(Love Like) Anthrax" and "Armalite Rifle", was recorded in June 1978 and released on 10 December 1978, on Edinburgh's Fast Product label. It was a Number 1 indie chart hit and John Peel radio show favourite. "Damaged Goods" was voted one of the 100 Greatest debut singles of all time in 2020's Rolling Stone Poll  Two Peel radio sessions followed, which, with their incendiary live performances, propelled the band to international attention and sold-out shows across Europe and North America. They were then signed by EMI Records. The group's debut single with this label, "At Home He's a Tourist", charted in 1979. Invited to appear on top rated BBC music program Top of the Pops, the band walked off the show when the BBC told them to sing "rubbish" in the place of the original lyric "rubbers", as the original line was considered too risqué. The single was then banned by BBC Radio and TV, which lost the band some support at EMI. King's lyrics were always controversial and a later single, "I Love a Man in a Uniform", was banned by the BBC during the Falklands War in 1982.

Critic Stewart Mason has called "Anthrax" not only the group's "most notorious song" but also "one of the most unique and interesting songs of its time". It's also a good example of Gang of Four's social perspective: after a minute-long, droning, feedback-laced guitar intro, the rhythm section sets up a funky, churning beat, and the guitar drops out entirely. In one stereo channel, King sings a "post-punk anti-love song", comparing himself to a beetle trapped on its back ("and there's no way for me to get up") and equating love with "a case of anthrax, and that's some thing I don't want to catch." Meanwhile, in the other stereo channel (and slightly less prominent in the mix), Gill reads (on the original EP version) a detailed account of the technical resources used on the song, which on the re-recorded album version is replaced by a deadpan monologue about public perception of love and the prevalence of love songs in popular music: "Love crops up quite a lot as something to sing about 'cause most groups make most of their songs about falling in love, or how happy they are to be in love; and you occasionally wonder why these groups do sing about it all the time." Although the two sets of lyrics tell independent stories they occasionally synchronise for emphasis.

According to critic Paul Morley, "The Gang spliced the ferocious precision of Dr. Feelgood's working-class blues with the testing avant-garde intrigue of Henry Cow. Wilfully avoiding structural obviousness, melodic prettiness and harmonic corniness, the Gang's music was studded with awkward holes and sharp corners." At the time, the band was recognised to be doing something very different from other white guitar acts. Ken Tucker, in Rolling Stone, 1980, wrote: "...rarely have the radical edges of black and white music come closer to overlapping... the Gang of Four utilize their bass guitar every bit as prominently and starkly as the curt bass figures that prod the spoken verses in (Kurtis Blow's "culture defining" huge summer hit) "The Breaks."

Later years (1980–1983) 
In 1981, the band released their second LP, Solid Gold. Like Entertainment!, the album was uncompromising, spare, and analytical. King's lyrics in such songs as "Cheeseburger", "He'd Send in the Army" and "In the Ditch" exposed the paradoxes of warfare, work and leisure. Van Gosse, in a Village Voice review said: "Gang of Four embody a new category in pop, which illuminates all the others, because the motor of their aesthetic is not a 'personal creative vision.'"

Dave Allen (who later co-founded Shriekback, King Swamp, Low Pop Suicide and the Elastic Purejoy) had left in 1981, and had been briefly replaced by Busta "Cherry" Jones, a sometime player with Parliament, Brian Eno and Talking Heads. After working with Gang of Four to complete their North American tour obligations, Jones left and was replaced by Sara Lee, who was Robert Fripp's bassist in the League of Gentlemen. Lee was as good a singer as bassist, and she helped give the band's third studio album, Songs of the Free, a more commercially accessible element. Although "I Love a Man in a Uniform" from the album was the band's most radio-friendly song, it was banned in the UK shortly after its release because Britain went to war in the Falkland Islands. In the spring of 1983, Burnham left the band after the release of Songs of the Free and formed Illustrated Man. Gill and King continued Gang of Four, releasing Hard in 1983.

After that, the band broke up, and Lee moved to the United States where she has worked with a number of artists, including the B-52's.

1986 saw the release of The Peel Sessions, a collection of rawly rendered material recorded during the period 1979 to 1981 for British radio BBC. Melody Maker dubbed the album "a perfect and classic nostalgia trip into the world of gaunt cynicism."

Gill and King reunion (1987–1997) 
Gill and King reunited to record Mall in 1991, and finally Shrinkwrapped in 1995. Mall featured Gail Ann Dorsey, later famous for her longtime association with David Bowie, on bass.

Changing line-ups (2004–2012) 
The original lineup of Jon King, Andy Gill, Dave Allen and Hugo Burnham reformed in November 2004. A UK tour in January 2005, shows in Europe and Japan and tours of the United States in May/June and again in September. In October 2005, Gang of Four released a new disc featuring new recordings of songs from the albums Entertainment!, Solid Gold and Songs of the Free entitled Return the Gift (which featured Mark Heaney on drums) accompanied by an album's worth of remixes.

In January 2011, the band, now featuring Mark Heaney on drums, and Thomas McNeice on bass, released a new album, Content, which was called "their best record since the Seventies". Jon Pareles, in a New York Times 4-star review, declared that [the band] "have reclaimed, with a vengeance, their old attack".
Following successful tours of the US, Australia and Europe in 2011, King and Gill disagreed about the band's direction and ceased working together.

Final line-up with Gill (2012–2020) 

Gill, against the wishes of King, continued to tour and record under the Gang of Four name. With new lead vocalist John Sterry, as well as a returning McNiece, the band released What Happens Next in 2015, Complicit in 2018, and Happy Now in 2019, which featured a range of guest artists. XSNoise said "The album [Happy Now] is as intense as any ever released on their discography."

Andy Gill died on 1 February 2020, and obituaries across the world hailed his legacy and impact. He was "one of the most influential musicians of the post-punk era, leading his band Gang of Four to huge acclaim with his intense, angular, staccato guitar work that blended rock with funk," said the Independent. Gang of Four's "brusque, angular style would directly or indirectly influence post-punk and indie-rock bands like Red Hot Chili Peppers (who chose Mr. Gill to produce their debut album), The Jesus Lizard, Nirvana, Rage Against the Machine, Franz Ferdinand and Protomartyr," said the New York Times, adding: "Michael Hutchence of INXS once said that Gang of Four’s music 'took no prisoners,' adding, 'It was art meets the devil via James Brown.'" The NME wrote: "Great musicians encapsulate their age; the very best echo endlessly onwards, and Andy Gill...has been reverberating along the baseline of alternative culture for 40 years."
Two EPs, This Heaven Gives Me Migraine, and Anti Hero were released after his death featuring some final studio recordings. A tribute album, The Problem of Leisure: A Celebration of Andy Gill and Gang of Four, was released in June 2021.

Reunion (2021–present)
King and Burnham reunited in 2022 with Sara Lee, who joined the band in 1981 and recorded on their third and fourth albums Songs of the Free and Hard, and joined on guitar by David Pajo of Slint. The band toured the US in March 2022 in support of the 77-81 box set, which got a Grammy Award nomination.

In January 2023, a US show was announced: the band will play at the Cruel World Festival in Pasadena, California on May 20, 2023.

Legacy

Gang of Four influenced a number of successful alternative rock acts throughout the 1980s and 1990s. R.E.M. frontman Michael Stipe cites Gang of Four as one of his band's chief influences; Flea of the Red Hot Chili Peppers has stated that Gang of Four were the single most important influence on his band's early music. Kurt Cobain stated that Nirvana started as "a Gang of Four and Scratch Acid ripoff". Gang of Four's debut album Entertainment! was ranked 13th in Kurt Cobain's list of his 50 favourite albums in his journal. Andy Kellman, writing in AllMusic, argued that Gang of Four's "germs of influence" can be found in many rap metal groups "not in touch with their ancestry enough to realize it". Damon Che, drummer of Don Caballero, cited Solid Gold as his early influence.

From the 2000s, the band enjoyed a resurgence in popularity, initially due to emergence of new post-punk revival bands such as Clinic, Liars, the Rapture, Neils Children and Radio 4, and then the rise of Franz Ferdinand, We Are Scientists and Bloc Party.

Band members

Current members
 Jon King – lead vocals, melodica (1976–1984, 1990–1991, 1993, 1995, 2004–2012, 2021–present)
 Hugo Burnham – drums (1976–1982, 2004–2006, 2021–present)
 Sara Lee – bass, backing vocals (1980–1984, 2021–present)
 David Pajo – guitar, backing vocals (2021–present)

Past members
 Andy Gill – guitars, backing and lead vocals (1976–1984, 1990–1991, 1993, 1995, 2004–2020; died 2020)
 Dave Wolfson – bass (1976)
 Dave Allen – bass, backing vocals (1977–1981, 2004–2008)
 Steve Goulding – drums (1983–1984)
 Eddi Reader – Vocals (1982-1983)
 Busta "Cherry" Jones – bass (1980; died 1995)
 Gail Ann Dorsey - bass (1990–1991)
 Mark Heaney – drums (2006–2013)
 Jonny Finnegan – drums (2014–2016)
 Thomas McNeice – bass, backing vocals (2008–2020)
 John "Gaoler" Sterry – lead vocals, percussion, melodica (2012–2020)
 Tobias Humble – drums (2016–2020)

Timeline

Discography

Studio albums
 Entertainment! (EMI, 1979) – UK Number 45, Australia Number 39
 Solid Gold (Warner Bros., 1981) – UK Number 52, US Pop Number 190
 Songs of the Free (Warner Bros., 1982) – UK Number 61, US Pop Number 175
 Hard (Warner Bros., 1983) – US Pop Number 168
 Mall (Polydor, 1991)
 Shrinkwrapped (Castle, 1995)
 Return the Gift (V2, 2005) – re-recordings of earlier tracks
 Content (Yep Roc, 2011)
 What Happens Next (Metropolis/Membran, 2015)
 Happy Now (Gill Music Ltd, 2019)

Live albums
 At the Palace (Mercury, 1984)
 Live...In The Moment (Metropolis, 2016)

Compilation albums
 The Peel Sessions (1990), Strange Fruit/Dutch East India
 A Brief History of the Twentieth Century (1990), Warner Bros
 100 Flowers Bloom (1998), Rhino
 Gang of Four 77-81 (2021), Matador

Extended plays
 Yellow (EMI, 1980) – US Pop Number 201
 Another Day/Another Dollar (Warner Bros., 1982) – US Pop Number 195
 The Peel Sessions (16.1.79) (1986), Strange Fruit
 Die Staubkorn Sammlung (Membran, 2015) (credited as Herbert Grönemeyer + Gang of Four)
 Complicit (2018) (download only)
 This Heaven Gives Me Migraine (2020)
 Anti Hero (2020)

Singles

References

External links
 
 Andy Gill website

Dance-punk musical groups
EMI Records artists
Post-punk groups from Leeds
Funk rock musical groups
Musical groups established in 1977
Musical groups disestablished in 1983
Musical groups reestablished in 1987
Musical groups disestablished in 1997
Musical groups reestablished in 2004
Musical groups disestablished in 2020
Musical groups reestablished in 2021
Musical quartets
Political music groups
Polydor Records artists
V2 Records artists
Warner Records artists
Grönland Records artists
Yep Roc Records artists
1976 establishments in England